Fernando Barceló Aragón (born 6 January 1996) is a Spanish cyclist, who currently rides for UCI ProTeam . In August 2019, he was named in the startlist for the 2019 Vuelta a España.

Major results
2014
 1st  Time trial, National Junior Road Championships
2018
 1st Stage 9 Tour de l'Avenir
 7th Overall Volta ao Alentejo
 3rd  Road race, UEC European Under-23 Road Championships
2019
 6th Tour de Vendée
 7th GP Miguel Induráin
 10th Overall Vuelta a Aragón
2021
 4th Overall Tour de Wallonie
2022
 7th Overall Troféu Joaquim Agostinho
 8th Prueba Villafranca de Ordizia
 9th Overall Tour of Slovenia
 10th Circuito de Getxo
2023
 6th Trofeo Andratx–Mirador D'es Colomer

Grand Tour general classification results timeline

References

External links

1996 births
Living people
Spanish male cyclists
Cyclists from Aragon
People from Huesca
Sportspeople from the Province of Huesca